James Colbert (3 January 1890 – 28 January 1970) was an Irish politician and farmer.

Early life
Born in the townland of Moanleana, Castlemahon, County Limerick, he was the son of Michael Colbert, a farmer, and Honora McDermott. An older brother Con Colbert, was executed for his part in the 1916 Easter Rising.

His family later moved to the village of Athea. In 1901, his family were living in the townland of Templeathea West.

Political activity
Colbert participated in the Irish War of Independence and the Irish Civil War.

He was first elected to Dáil Éireann as a Sinn Féin Teachta Dála (TD) for the Limerick constituency at the 1923 general election.  He did not take his seat in the 4th Dáil due to Sinn Féin's abstentionist policy. He was elected as a Fianna Fáil TD at the June 1927 general election. He was re-elected at the September 1927 and 1932 general elections. He lost his seat at the 1933 general election.

Death
Colbert, who was a resident of Bray, County Wicklow, died on 28 January 1970 in Dublin. He was buried in Glasnevin Cemetery.

James Colbert and Michael Colbert, who both represented Fianna Fáil for Limerick at different times, were cousins.

References

1890 births
1970 deaths
Early Sinn Féin TDs
Fianna Fáil TDs
Members of the 4th Dáil
Members of the 5th Dáil
Members of the 6th Dáil
Members of the 7th Dáil
Politicians from County Limerick
Irish farmers
Burials at Glasnevin Cemetery